Bildt may refer to:

People
 Bildt family, an old Norwegian-Danish-Swedish noble family traditionally domiciled in Bohus county
Anna Maria Corazza Bildt (born 1963), Italian-Swedish politician; married to Carl Bildt
Daniel Knudsen Bildt (1602-1651), Dano-Norwegian military officer

Daniel Bildt (1792–1827), Swedish Army lieutenant colonel
Gillis Bildt (1820-1894), Swedish politician, Prime Minister 1888-1889
Carl Bildt (1850–1931), Swedish diplomat
Harald Bildt (1876–1947), Swedish diplomat
Didrik Bildt (1879–1933), Swedish explorer
Knut Gillis Bildt (1854–1927), Swedish Army general and politician
Nils Bildt (1889–1969), Swedish Army officer
Daniel Bildt (1920–2010), Swedish bureau director
Carl Bildt (born 1949), Swedish politician and diplomat, Prime Minister 1991-1994

Other uses
Het Bildt, a municipality in the northern Netherlands
Bildts, the dialect spoken in Het Bildt

See also
 Bild (disambiguation)